A blossom is the flower of stone fruit trees and some other small plants.

Blossom(s) may also refer to:

Places
 Blossom, New York, an unincorporated hamlet
 Blossom, Texas, a town
 Blossom Point, Wrangel Island
 Cape Blossom, Alaska

People
 Beverly Schmidt Blossom (1926–2014), American modern dancer, choreographer and teacher
 Edward Blossom, an alias of Joseph Smith, and Mrs. Blossom - see List of Joseph Smith's wives
 Henry Blossom (1866–1919), American lyricist
 Roberts Blossom (1924–2011), American actor and poet
 Rose Blossom, American actress
 Blossom Chukwujekwu (born 1983), Nigerian actor
 Blossom Dearie (1924–2009), American jazz singer
 Maxine (Blossom) Miles (born 1901), British aviation engineer, socialite, and businesswoman
 Blossom Rock (1895–1978), American actress
 Blossom Seeley (1891–1974), American jazz singer and entertainer
 Blümchen (Jasmin Wagner), German singer who uses the name Blossom when singing in English

Arts, entertainment, and media

Fictional characters
 Blossom Russo, the titular character in the 1990s American sitcom Blossom
 Blossom Jackson, from the BBC soap opera EastEnders
 Princess Blossom Pepperdoodle von Yum Yum (or "Blossom"), from Fetch! with Ruff Ruffman, a children's TV show
 Blossom, in the American animated series Little Mouse on the Prairie
 Blossom Utonium, in the American animated series The Powerpuff Girls
 Blossom (Momoko Akatsutsumi), in the Japanese anime series Powerpuff Girls Z
 Cheryl Blossom, in the Archie Comics universe

Literature
 Blossom (novel), a 1990 novel by Andrew Vachss
 "The Blossom", a poem by William Blake, published in 1789

Music
 Blossoms (band), a rock band from Stockport, England
 The Blossoms, a backing singing group who achieved their greatest success in the 1960s
 Blossom (Frank Carter & The Rattlesnakes album)
 Blossom (Milky Chance album)
 "Blossom" (Kerli song), 2016
 "Blossom (EP)" by Laboum
 "Moon/Blossom", a 2010 song by Ayumi Hamasaki

Television
 Blossom (TV series), a 1990s American sitcom

Events
 Blossom Cup, a professional tennis tournament for women held annually in Quanzhou, China, since 2009
 Blossom Festival, an annual music festival of orchestral music at the Blossom Music Center
 Blossom Kite Festival, formerly the Smithsonian Kite Festival, an annual event held in Washington, DC

Facilities
 Blossom Athletic Center, San Antonio, Texas
 Blossom Music Center, Cuyahoga Falls, Ohio

Mathematics
 Blossom (functional), a functional for polynomials
 Blossom (graph theory), a subgraph in which removing any vertex leaves a graph with a perfect matching

Military
 HMS Blossom, two Royal Navy ships
 Operation Priha (Blossom), a series of Israeli operations during the War of Attrition

Surnames from nicknames